Person to Person is a 2017 American drama film directed and written by Dustin Guy Defa. The film stars Michael Cera, Tavi Gevinson, and Abbi Jacobson.

The film had its world premiere at the Sundance Film Festival on January 20, 2017. It was released on July 28, 2017, by Magnolia Pictures.

Plot
During a day in New York City, a reporter trains a new employee while covering a story about a possible murder where a watch repairman may have important information; a record collector finds a rare piece of vinyl; two brothers track down their sister's ex-boyfriend who posted nude pictures of her online, and a questioning teenage girl explores her feelings when she kisses a boy.

Cast

Production
Principal photography on the film began on December 3, 2015, in New York City. The movie was photographed on 16 mm film.

Release
The film had its world premiere at the Sundance Film Festival on January 20, 2017.
Shortly after, Magnolia Pictures acquired distribution rights to the film.
It was given a limited release on July 28, 2017.

Critical reception
Person to Person holds a 52% approval rating on the review aggregator website Rotten Tomatoes, based on 46 reviews, with a weighted average of 4.93/10. The site's consensus reads: "Person to Persons moments of insight and absorbing character development are scattered among an aimless, disjointed narrative".

Christy Lemire from RogerEbert.com gave the film 1.5/4 stars, noting "Various characters populate “Person to Person,” but they rarely register as actual people. And while some of their storylines intersect throughout the course of a day in New York, they rarely connect in ways that have actual meaning."

References

External links
 
 

2017 films
Films shot in New York City
Films set in New York City
American drama films
2017 independent films
2017 drama films
2010s English-language films
2010s American films